Nymphargus cariticommatus is a species of frog in the family Centrolenidae.
It is endemic to the southern Amazonian slopes of the Cordillera Oriental in Ecuador. Its natural habitats are old-growth cloud forests. It is threatened by habitat loss due to agricultural development and logging.

References

cariticommatus
Amphibians of Ecuador
Endemic fauna of Ecuador
Taxonomy articles created by Polbot
Amphibians described in 1994